Choni may refer to:

Chone Monastery, in Jonê County, western China
Choni language, dialect of a Tibetic language spoken in western China
Jonê County, in Gansu Province, western China
Honi HaMe'agel,  Choni, Jewish scholar of the 1st-century BC
Xionites,  Chionites, a nomadic people in Transoxania and Bactria in 1st-6th century AD